Burnham may refer to:

Places

Canada
Burnham, Saskatchewan

England
Burnham, Buckinghamshire
Burnham railway station
Burnham Grammar School
Burnham Green, Hertfordshire, location of The White Horse
Burnham, Lincolnshire
High Burnham, Isle of Axholme, Lincolnshire
Low Burnham, Isle of Axholme, Lincolnshire
Norfolk Burnhams

New Zealand
Burnham, New Zealand army base

United States
Burnham, Illinois
Burnham, Maine
Burnham, Missouri
Burnham, Pennsylvania
Mount Burnham, a peak along the San Gabriel Mountains in California

Other uses
Burnham (band), a Vermont-based Pop-Rock band 
Burnham (crater), on the Moon
Burnham (surname)
Baron Burnham, a title in the Peerage of the United Kingdom
Burnham Institute for Medical Research, a nonprofit medical research institute
J.W. Burnham House, historic house in Louisiana, USA
Operation Burnham, a military action of the NZSAS in 2010. 
Burnham F.C. football team

See also